Zhushan is a village in Zhusha urban village of Jincheng Township, Kinmen County, Fujian Province, Republic of China. It is also the home of the Xue clan in Kinmen.

See also
 Village (Taiwan)

References

Geography of Kinmen County
Jincheng Township
Villages in Taiwan